John Hopkins (born c. 1969) is a former college football placekicker who played for Stanford University from 1987 to 1990.

Hopkins' biggest game at Stanford was also his last: the 93rd Big Game, played on November 17, 1990. In the game, Stanford scored with twelve seconds left but still trailed Cal 25-24. Hopkins kicked an onside kick which Stanford recovered. On the next play, Cal was cited for roughing quarterback Jason Palumbis. Hopkins came in and connected on a 39-yard field goal as time expired to give Stanford a 27-25 victory. The kick also gave Hopkins the Stanford record for most field goals in a game with 5. He also still holds the record for most field goals in a season, having kicked 19 of 24 field goals in the 1988 season.

References

1960s births
Living people
American football placekickers
Stanford Cardinal football players